The 2012 Masters Guinot-Mary Cohr is a tennis team exhibition event played on clay the week before the French Open. It features two teams, Guinot (Red) and Mary Cohr (Green). This year featured 9 rubbers to the usual 6 rubbers to the previous years that it was played.

Players

Guinot 
  David Nalbandian (#40) (Captain)
  Andy Murray (#4)
  Juan Martín del Potro (#9)
  Juan Mónaco (#15)
  Fernando Verdasco (#16)
  Marcos Baghdatis (#41)
  Michaël Llodra (#57)
  Arnaud Clément (#139)
  Paul-Henri Mathieu (#258)

 Mary Cohr 
  Julien Benneteau (#32) (Captain)
  Jo-Wilfried Tsonga (#5)
  Alexandr Dolgopolov (#19)
  Stanislas Wawrinka (#21)
  Mikhail Youzhny (#30)
  Kevin Anderson (#34)
  Ernests Gulbis (#92)
  Vasek Pospisil (#102)
  Simone Bolelli (#111)

Score

Draw

Day 1

Day 2

Day 3

External links 
 Official website

Masters Guinot Mary Cohr